Eugoa vagigutta is a moth of the family Erebidae first described by Francis Walker in 1862. It is found on Borneo. The habitat consists of alluvial forests, forest on limestone, lowland dipterocarp forests and open coastal forests.

References

vagigutta
Moths described in 1862